Amiss–Palmer House, also known as the Palmer House, is a historic home located at Blacksburg, Montgomery County, Virginia.  It was built the 1850s, and is a two-storey three-bay brick house with a hipped roof and pattern-book Greek Revival style elements. These elements include the front portico and frieze.  It has a traditional double-pile center-passage form. Also on the property are the contributing kitchen, a two-storey three-bay log house and a smokehouse.

It was listed on the National Register of Historic Places in 1989.

References

Houses on the National Register of Historic Places in Virginia
Greek Revival houses in Virginia
Houses completed in 1855
Houses in Montgomery County, Virginia
Buildings and structures in Blacksburg, Virginia
National Register of Historic Places in Montgomery County, Virginia